Dying Inside is a science fiction novel by American writer Robert Silverberg. It was nominated for the Nebula Award in 1972, and both the Hugo and Locus Awards in 1973.

Publication history
It was originally serialized in the American magazine Galaxy Science Fiction between the July  1972 and September 1972 issues.

Summary

The novel's main character, David Selig, is an undistinguished man living in New York City. David was born with a telepathic gift allowing him to read minds. Rather than use his ability for any greater good, however, Selig squanders his power, using it only for his own convenience.  At the beginning of the novel, David earns a living by reading the minds of college students so that he can better plagiarize reports and essays on their behalf.

As the novel progresses, Selig's power becomes continually weaker, working sporadically and sometimes not at all, and Selig struggles to maintain his grip on reality as he begins to lose an ability on which he has long since grown dependent.

The book contains a number of memorable elements, such as David's relationship with a fellow telepath he meets as a young adult, or his strained interaction with his estranged younger sister (who has long distrusted him because of his ability), or his obsession, during one section of the novel, with proving that his girlfriend, a woman named Kitty, is also telepathic after he discovers that he can't read her mind.  There is also a moment where David's power causes him to vicariously experience his girlfriend's acid trip, and a bravura sequence in which the adolescent Selig, during a visit to a farm, enters the minds of, variously, a fish swimming in a stream, a hen laying an egg, and a young couple in the midst of passionate sex.

Reception
Michael Dirda, reviewing the 2009 reissue in the Washington Post, described Dying Inside as:... widely regarded as Robert Silverberg's masterpiece. ... It's insane that 'Dying Inside' should be subtly dismissed as merely a genre classic. This is a superb novel about a common human sorrow, that great shock of middle age -- the recognition that we are all dying inside and that all of us must face the eventual disappearance of the person we have been.

Ted Gioia at Conceptual Fiction, wrote: Issues of aging and decline, maturity and grace--rarely dealt with in any popular fiction, and with a few exceptions (such as Flowers for Algernon) almost completely neglected in sci-fi--are the key themes at work here.  They are handled so deftly and vividly that one inevitably wonders about the connections between David Selig the character and Robert Silverberg the author.
Silverberg has called it "as mundane in texture as any novel I've ever written."

Literary and other allusions 

Dying Inside makes frequent references to various artists, writers and other academics, including:

Poets: Dante Alighieri, Charles Baudelaire, Robert Browning, Thomas Carew, Richard Crashaw, John Donne, T. S. Eliot, Allen Ginsberg, Johann Wolfgang Goethe, Homer, Rudyard Kipling, Comte de Lautréamont, Stéphane Mallarmé, Pindar, Ezra Pound, Arthur Rimbaud, Lord Tennyson, Thomas Traherne, Paul Verlaine, W. B. Yeats
Painters: Hieronymus Bosch, Pieter Bruegel, M. C. Escher, El Greco, Pablo Picasso, Giovanni Battista Piranesi
Composers: Johann Sebastian Bach, Béla Bartók, Ludwig van Beethoven, Alban Berg, Gustav Mahler, Claudio Monteverdi, Giovanni Pierluigi da Palestrina, Arnold Schoenberg, Igor Stravinsky, Richard Wagner
Playwrights: Aeschylus, Samuel Beckett, William Cartwright, Euripides, Ben Jonson, William Shakespeare, George Bernard Shaw, Sophocles
Novelists: Isaac Asimov, Honoré de Balzac, John Barth, Saul Bellow, J. D. Beresford, Ray Bradbury, William S. Burroughs, Louis-Ferdinand Céline, Arthur C. Clarke, Joseph Conrad, Fyodor Dostoevsky, William Faulkner, F. Scott Fitzgerald, E. M. Forster, Jean Genet, Dashiell Hammett, Thomas Hardy, Robert A. Heinlein, Joseph Heller, Ernest Hemingway, Aldous Huxley, James Joyce, Franz Kafka, D. H. Lawrence, Harper Lee, Norman Mailer, Bernard Malamud, André Malraux, Thomas Mann, George Orwell, Marcel Proust, Thomas Pynchon, Rafael Sabatini, Walter Scott, Olaf Stapledon, Theodore Sturgeon, William Makepeace Thackeray, Mark Twain, John Updike, Jules Verne, H. G. Wells, Virginia Woolf, Émile Zola
Philosophers: Thomas Aquinas, Aristotle, Augustine of Hippo, Simone de Beauvoir, Søren Kierkegaard, Arthur Koestler, Laozi, Claude Lévi-Strauss, Karl Marx, Michel de Montaigne, Bertrand Russell, Henry David Thoreau, Arnold Toynbee
Scientists and pseudo-scientists: Alfred Adler, William Bates, Edgar Cayce, Sigmund Freud, Josiah Willard Gibbs, Carl Jung,  Timothy Leary, Wilhelm Reich, Joseph Banks Rhine, Immanuel Velikovsky, Norbert Wiener, Karl Zener

References

External links
 Dying Inside at Worlds Without End

1972 American novels
1972 science fiction novels
American science fiction novels
Novels about telepathy
Novels by Robert Silverberg
Novels set in New York City